"Sandwiches" is a song by American electronic band Detroit Grand Pubahs. It reached number 29 on the Hot Dance Club Songs chart.

Track listing

Charts

References

External links 

 
 
 

2000 singles
2000 songs
American electronic songs
Jive Records singles